Semicassis pyrum, common name the "pear bonnet" or "common helmet", is a species of large sea snail, a marine gastropod mollusc in the family Cassidae, the helmet shells, bonnet shells and their allies.

References

 Powell A. W. B., William Collins Publishers Ltd, Auckland 1979 
 

Cassidae
Taxa named by Jean-Baptiste Lamarck
Gastropods described in 1822